Nada Tončić (July 30, 1909 – March 29, 1998) was a Croatian soprano opera singer.

Tončić was born in Syrmian city of Zemun (then in Kingdom of Croatia-Slavonia, Kingdom of Hungary, Austria-Hungary, now in Belgrade Region, Serbia).  She studied singing at the Zagreb Academy of Music.  Her career began in 1933 in the opera company of the Croatian National Theatre in Zagreb, where she remained until 1963.

Her lyric soprano became famous in her roles in La traviata, Ero s onoga svijeta, Madame Butterfly, Porin, Eugene Onegin and others.

She died in Varaždin, Croatia, in 1998, at the age of 89.

External links 
 Vijenac Marija Barbieri: Opus kakva više nema, July 22, 2005
 Donacija Josip Crnobori Josip Crnobori: portret Nade Tončić, olovka na papiru
 Knjižnica Varaždin 29. ožujka

1909 births
1998 deaths
Croatian operatic sopranos
Croats of Vojvodina
Syrmia
20th-century Croatian women opera singers
Yugoslav women opera singers
Serbian emigrants to Croatia